Frances Bean Cobain (born August 18, 1992) is an American visual artist and model. She is the only child of  Nirvana frontman Kurt Cobain and Hole frontwoman Courtney Love. She controls the publicity rights to her father's name and image.

Early life 
Frances Bean Cobain was born on August 18, 1992, at Cedars-Sinai Medical Center in Los Angeles, California. She was named after Frances McKee, the guitarist for the Scottish indie pop duo The Vaselines, not actress Frances Farmer, as has been commonly assumed. Former R.E.M. frontman Michael Stipe and actress Drew Barrymore are her godparents.

Cobain's sonogram photo – the origin of her middle name, as her father thought she looked like a kidney bean – was featured on the sleeve of Nirvana's 1992 single "Lithium".

Before Cobain's birth, there were rumors suggesting that her mother used heroin during the pregnancy. This scandal intensified when Vanity Fair published Lynn Hirschberg's article "Strange Love", which alleged that Love admitted to using heroin even after learning of her pregnancy. Love and Kurt Cobain maintained that Vanity Fair took her words out of context. Eventually, child welfare services launched an investigation into their parenting abilities. The investigation was ultimately dismissed, but not without a significant amount of legal wrangling and Cobain being removed from her parents' custody for a short time, beginning when she was just two weeks old.

On April 1, 1994, Cobain visited her father at the Exodus Recovery Center, a rehab center in Marina del Rey, California, where they played together. This was the last time she saw her father alive; one week later, he was found dead at his home in Seattle. Cobain was subsequently raised by her mother, aunts, and paternal grandmother. She spent her early years in Seattle and Los Angeles, and was placed in her grandmother's care for a time after her mother's drug-related arrest in October 2003. Hours after the arrest, Love overdosed on painkillers. Love regained custody of Cobain in 2005.

During her young adulthood, Cobain attended Bard College, where she studied art.

Career

Modeling 
In August 2006, she was photographed for Elle UK magazine in her father's famous brown cardigan and pajama pants as part of an article featuring children of rock stars in their parents' clothing. She explained, "I wore his pajamas because he got married in them to my mom in 1992 in Hawaii so I thought they would be cute if I wore them today. He was too lazy to put on a tux so he got married in pajamas!" In February 2008, she appeared in a photo spread for Harper's Bazaar dressed as Evita. Cobain modeled for Hedi Slimane for a web photo series released August 2, 2011. In 2016, she modeled alongside Alice Glass in a spread for Schön! magazine shot by Floria Sigismondi. In 2017, she was announced as the face of Marc Jacobs's Spring/Summer campaign for that year, shot by David Sims.

Artwork 
In July 2010, Cobain debuted a collection of artwork titled Scumfuck under the pseudonym "Fiddle Tim" at the La Luz de Jesus Gallery in Los Angeles. On August 4, 2012, she participated in the group show 'MiXTAPE' under her real name. Artists were asked to pick a song and create art inspired by that song. Cobain chose the song "Black" by The Jesus and Mary Chain. The eclectic mix of songs chosen were featured for digital download on iTunes. Opening on June 7, 2017, through June 30, Cobain and artist Lindsey Way held a joint art exhibition titled "Ghosts For Sale" at Gallery 30 South in Pasadena.

Other ventures 
According to Rolling Stone magazine, the title and cover photograph for the 2005 Nirvana rarities album Sliver: The Best of the Box were chosen by 13-year old Cobain. Cobain worked as an intern for Rolling Stone magazine from June to August 2008. She was featured in the magazine years later, photographed by David LaChapelle. In 2009, it was reported that Cobain had turned down the role of Alice in Tim Burton's film Alice in Wonderland.

Cobain appeared as a guest vocalist on the song "My Space" from the album Evelyn Evelyn by Evelyn Evelyn, which was released on March 30, 2010. Amanda Palmer from Evelyn clarified that Cobain was one of some 20 artists who sang the same line and whose voices were mixed together in the recording. Cobain was also an executive producer on the HBO movie about her father's life, Kurt Cobain: Montage of Heck. In 2019, she appeared as a special guest judge in one episode of RuPaul's Drag Race All Stars season 4.

 Personal life 
In September 2005, 13-year-old Cobain gave her first interview to Teen Vogue'', in which she discussed her personal style and mentioned her parents.

On December 11, 2009, a California Superior Court in Los Angeles appointed Wendy O'Connor, her paternal grandmother, and Kimberly Cobain, her father's sister, as Cobain's temporary co-guardians. On December 16, 2009, a judge issued a related temporary restraining order prohibiting Love from having any direct or indirect contact with her daughter. The papers were filed under the heading "motion to seal all documents... relating to a minor and allegations of domestic violence". Among those documents are Cobain's medical records, according to the filing.

On August 18, 2010, Cobain inherited 37% of her late father's estate. She now controls the publicity rights to her father's name and image instead of Love. During Cobain's divorce proceedings from Isaiah Silva it was revealed that she earned, from July 2016 until June 2017, $95,496 per month from the royalties related to her father's estate in addition to $6,784 per month in dividends ($102,280 total per month, $1.2 million per year). Her net worth was estimated at $11.3 million. Her father's estate was valued in 2014 as being worth $450 million.

Cobain has said she is not a fan of grunge bands, instead preferring the music of artists such as Oasis, The Brian Jonestown Massacre, and Mercury Rev, but she has said she likes the Nirvana songs "Territorial Pissings" and "Dumb".

Cobain and musician Isaiah Silva from The Eeries married on June 29, 2014, though the wedding date was widely misreported as around September 2015. By March 23, 2016, Cobain had filed for divorce. On November 30, 2017, the divorce was finalized.

Cobain, along with Wendy O'Connor and Kim Cobain (Kurt's mother and sister, respectively), attended the opening of "Growing Up Kurt Cobain" at the Museum of Style Icons in Newbridge, County Kildare, Ireland on July 17, 2018. At the exhibition, Cobain said she often uses the phrase, 'peace, love, empathy', which her father used in his suicide note, because she wants to "reclaim the peace, love, empathy thing as something that's meant for health and for compassion and for true peace, love, and empathy."

 Cobain has been in a relationship with professional skateboarder and musician Riley Hawk, son of skateboarding icon Tony Hawk.

References

External links 

Frances Bean Cobain biography
 

1992 births
American people of Dutch descent
American people of English descent
American people of French descent
American people of German descent
American people of Irish descent
American people of Scottish descent
American women artists
Artists from Los Angeles
Artists from Seattle
Bard College alumni
Courtney Love
Female models from California
Living people
Waldorf school alumni